The 2022–23 season is the 103rd season in the history of U.S. Sassuolo Calcio and their 10th consecutive season in the top flight. The club are participating in Serie A and the Coppa Italia.

Players

Other players under contract

Out on loan 
.

Transfers

In

Loans in

Out

Loans out

Pre-season and friendlies

Competitions

Overall record

Serie A

League table

Results summary

Results by round

Matches 
The league fixtures were announced on 24 June 2022.

Coppa Italia

References

U.S. Sassuolo Calcio seasons
Sassuolo